Donald Buchanan Blue (May 6, 1901 – December 4, 1974) was a Canadian politician, auctioneer, farmer and merchant. He was born in Huron Township, Ontario, Canada. He was elected to the House of Commons of Canada in the 1949 election as a Member of the Liberal Party to represent the riding of Bruce. He was defeated in the elections of 1953 and 1957.

External links
 

1901 births
1974 deaths
Liberal Party of Canada MPs
Members of the House of Commons of Canada from Ontario